= 1960 Ålandic legislative election =

Legislative elections were held in Åland on 15 June 1960.

== Results ==
Party	Votes	%	Seats	+/–
Åländsk samling I - Borgerliga eller opolitiska	3,726	75.47	25	+1
Åländsk samling II - Socialdemokraterna	980	19.85	4	New
Folkdemokraterna	231	4.68	1	–1
Total	4,937	100.00	30	0
Valid votes	4,937	98.27		
Invalid/blank votes	87	1.73		
Total votes	5,024	100.00		
